Naousa is a fishing village in the Cyclades. It is located in the northeastern corner of the island of Paros, and it has a population of 2,870.

In the summer Naousa attracts many tourists from all around Europe because of the climate and the nearby beaches, like Kolympithres. During the winter, it is cold and occasionally snowy.

History
In 1770–1775, during the Russo-Turkish War of 1768–1774 and the Orlov Revolt, Naousa was a Russian naval base, known in Russian as Auza, and the administrative centre of Alexey Orlov's military expedition.

References 

Populated places in Paros (regional unit)
Paros